Thomas Clare (20 August 1883 – 6 May 1940) was an English cricketer: a right-handed batsman and right arm fast bowler who played two first-class games for Worcestershire, almost five years apart, in the 1920s. Both matches were at Amblecote.

His highest score of 34 came against Lancashire in the second innings of his debut in August 1920. This constituted exactly half of Worcestershire's paltry total of 68; the county lost by an innings inside two days having been routed by a career-best 7/34 from James Tyldesley.
Clare's only other first-class outing was against Surrey in June 1925; he hit 25 in the second innings.

Notes

References
 
 

1883 births
1940 deaths
English cricketers
Worcestershire cricketers